Abdul Karim Kho'ini Zanjani, (1874–1938) was an Iranian scholar and cleric.

Personal life 
In 1874, Karim was born in Kho'ini. His father was Mlaabrahym bin Ishaq ibn Imran Sheikh Ansari. His mother was the daughter of Sheikh Abdul Karim Oil Qazvin. She had a higher education. Karim's mother had a keen interest in spirituality.  He married in Najaf and then returned to Qazvin, where he died in 1938 after going to Kho'ini. He was buried in the new cemetery.

Education 
Karim received his early education at Immaculate Seminary Qazvin. He moved to Najaf for his higher education.

His professors in Najaf were:

 Mohammed Kazem Yazdi
 Fethullah Qa'ravi Isfahani
 Akhund Khorasani
 Muhammad Hujjat Kuh-Kamari
 Mirza Mohammad Taqi Shirazi

Return to Zanjan 
Karim returned to Zanjan in 1908 to promote religion, the affairs of the Muslim people, and to train seminary students. Mirza Baqir Zanjani taught alongside prominent teachers such as Sayed Ahmad Zanjani, a leading scholar in Qom during the Boroujerdi time.

See also 
 Mirza Jawad Agha Maleki Tabrizi
 Hibatuddin Shahrestani
 Mohammad Hossein Esheni Qudejani
 Noureddin Esheni Qudejani

References 

People from Zanjan, Iran
Iranian Shia clerics
1874 births
1938 deaths
Pupils of Muhammad Kadhim Khorasani